Tarzan the Ape Man is a 1932 pre-Code American action adventure film released by Metro-Goldwyn-Mayer  featuring Edgar Rice Burroughs' famous jungle hero Tarzan and starring Johnny Weissmuller, Neil Hamilton, C. Aubrey Smith and Maureen O'Sullivan. It was Weissmuller's first of 12 Tarzan films. O'Sullivan played Jane in six features between 1932 and 1942. The film is loosely based on Burroughs' 1912 novel Tarzan of the Apes, with the dialogue written by Ivor Novello. The film was directed by W. S. Van Dyke. Metro-Goldwyn-Mayer released two remakes of Tarzan, the Ape Man in  1959 and in 1981, but each was a different adaptation of Rice Burroughs' novel. It is also the first appearance of Tarzan's famous yell.

Plot
James Parker and Harry Holt travel in Africa on a quest for the legendary elephant burial grounds and their ivory. They are joined by Parker's daughter Jane. Holt is attracted to Jane, and tries somewhat ineffectively to protect her from the jungle's dangers. The expedition encounters an attack by both hippopotami and crocodiles. The mysterious Tarzan wards off the attack, but abducts Jane.

The experience is terrifying to Jane at first, but as their relationship develops, she finds herself happy; "not a bit afraid, not a bit sorry". As she returns to her father, her feelings are brought to a test. She wants Tarzan to come with her to London, and to be part of her world. But Tarzan turns his back on her and returns to the jungle. Her father tells her that is where Tarzan belongs, she cries, "no dad, he belongs to me".

The expedition is captured by a tribe of aggressive dwarfs. Jane sends Tarzan's ape friend Cheeta (Jiggs) for help, bringing Tarzan to their rescue. During the rescue, Tarzan summons elephants and they escape from the dwarf's stronghold, although Jane's father dies from wounds just as they reach the elephant graveyard. Jane decides to stay in the jungle with Tarzan and in the final scene, to the music of Tchaikovsky's Romeo and Juliet, the happy couple appear on a rock, Jane holding Cheeta like a baby.

Cast

Johnny Weissmuller as Tarzan
 Maureen O'Sullivan as Jane Parker
Neil Hamilton as Harry Holt
 C. Aubrey Smith as James Parker
 Doris Lloyd as Mrs Cutten
 Forrester Harvey as Beamish
 Ivory Williams as Riano
 Ray Corrigan as Ape 
 Johnny Eck as Bird Creature
 Angelo Rossitto as Evil Dwarf (uncredited)

Production
MGM finally found who they were looking for when they came across decorated Olympian, Weissmuller. The professional swimmer had five gold medals in the 1924 and 1928 Olympics, alongside 67 world and 52 national titles. The only obstacle with signing him onto the role was his contract to model BVD underwear. In order for them to release him from the contract, MGM agreed to have actresses such as Greta Garbo and Marie Dressler, to be featured in BVD ads.

The film was shot on Lot One of the Metro-Goldwyn-Mayer studios in Culver City, California and at the Lake Sherwood area north of Los Angeles as well as Silver Springs in Florida. Lions from the film were borrowed from nearby Goebel's Lion Farm in Thousand Oaks, CA. Goebel himself would often camp by the filming site near Lake Sherwood to watch his lions during filming.

As with most Weissmuller Tarzan films, the elephants were Indian, which have smaller ears, rather than African, so large fake ears, and fake tusks, were fitted onto the animals in an attempt to make them look authentic. Similarly, the tribe of African dwarfs, made to look like pygmies (all males), portrayed in the film was actually a cast of several white midgets wearing blackface.

Stock footage made in Africa for W.S. Van Dyke's Trader Horn was added to location work shot in the then-undeveloped Toluca Lake region north of Los Angeles.

Release
The film was released on April 2, 1932.

Reception
The movie proved to be a huge hit, pulling in nearly $1 million in profits. The overall success of the film lead MGM to star Weissmuller and O'Sullivan in a total of five sequels.

References 

 DVD commentary for the Tarzan Collection DVD set released in 2005.

External links

 
 
 
 
 Tarzan the Ape Man at FilmSite.org
 Tarzan the Ape Man history at ERBzine.com
 

1932 films
1930s fantasy adventure films
1930s English-language films
American black-and-white films
American fantasy adventure films
Blackface minstrel shows and films
Films about dwarfs
Films about kidnapping
Films directed by W. S. Van Dyke
Films produced by Irving Thalberg
Films set in Africa
Films shot in Los Angeles
Metro-Goldwyn-Mayer films
Films with screenplays by Cyril Hume
Tarzan films
Films about people with dwarfism
1930s American films